David John Corzine (born April 25, 1956) is an American retired professional basketball player in the National Basketball Association (NBA).

Biography
A Chicago-area native who went to John Hersey High School in Arlington Heights and DePaul University in Chicago, Corzine was the 18th overall pick of the 1978 NBA draft by the Washington Bullets. With the Bullets, Corzine participated in the 1979 NBA Finals but they lost in five games to the Seattle SuperSonics. After two years with the Bullets and two more with the San Antonio Spurs, Corzine returned to his hometown to play for the Chicago Bulls for seven seasons, where he started in 285 out of 556 games played for the team.

He was then traded to the Orlando Magic for two second-round picks (which the Chicago Bulls used to select Toni Kukoč and P.J. Brown, respectively) on June 27, 1989. He began the 1989–90 season as the inaugural Orlando Magic's first starting center, but just as early as in a game no.3 against the Cleveland Cavaliers (won by the Magic in overtime giving them 2–1 record) in a first quarter he got serious ligament damage in his left knee, and was subsequently forced to miss a lot of time. He returned to play a few minutes in three late-December games the same year, but hurt the knee again, and never suited up for the team again after that. After the season, he signed with the Seattle SuperSonics as a Free Agent on October 4, 1990. At the time of his signing, his attorney, Herb Rudoy allegedly said: "Dave is excited, but he's going to get into it slowly. He's looking to play four or five more years in this league." – As it turned out, most likely because of the injuries and lack of playing time, he would only play that one final season to finish his NBA career.

He averaged 8.5 points, 5.9 rebounds, 0.4 steals, and 1.0 blocks per game in the NBA and his best season was arguable with the Chicago Bulls in 1982–83 when he averaged 14.0 points and 8.7 rebounds per game, or the 1983–84 NBA season, where he played and started all 82 games and had career-highs in many statistical categories, including steals, assists, blocks, FT%, and 3-PT%.

NBA career statistics

Regular season 

|-
| style="text-align:left;"| 
| style="text-align:left;"|Washington
| 59 || – || 9.0 || .534 || – || .778 || 2.5 || 0.8 || 0.2 || 0.2 || 3.0
|-
| style="text-align:left;"| 
| style="text-align:left;"|Washington
| 78 || – || 10.6 || .417 || – || .662 || 3.5 || 0.8 || 0.1 || 0.4 || 2.9
|-
| style="text-align:left;"| 
| style="text-align:left;"|San Antonio
| 82 || – || 23.9 || .490 || .000 || .714 || 7.8 || 1.4 || 0.5 || 1.2 || 10.5
|-
| style="text-align:left;"| 
| style="text-align:left;"|San Antonio
| 82 || 21 || 26.7 || .519 || .250 || .746 || 7.7 || 1.6 || 0.4 || 1.5 || 10.1
|-
| style="text-align:left;"| 
| style="text-align:left;"|Chicago
| 82 || 71 || 30.4 || .497 || .000 || .720 || 8.7 || 1.9 || 0.6 || 1.3 || 14.0
|-
| style="text-align:left;"| 
| style="text-align:left;"|Chicago
| 82 || 82 || 32.6 || .467 || .333 || .840 || 7.0 || 2.5 || 0.7 || 1.5 || 12.2
|-
| style="text-align:left;"| 
| style="text-align:left;"|Chicago
| 82 || 50 || 25.1 || .486 || .000 || .745 || 5.1 || 1.7 || 0.4 || 0.8 || 8.5
|-
| style="text-align:left;"| 
| style="text-align:left;"|Chicago
| 67 || 4 || 25.5 || .491 || .250 || .743 || 6.5 || 2.2 || 0.4 || 0.8 || 9.6
|-
| style="text-align:left;"| 
| style="text-align:left;"|Chicago
| 82 || 39 || 27.9 || .475 || .000 || .736 || 6.6 || 2.5 || 0.5 || 1.1 || 8.3
|-
| style="text-align:left;"| 
| style="text-align:left;"|Chicago
| 80 || 32 || 29.1 || .481 || .111 || .752 || 6.6 || 1.9 || 0.5 || 1.2 || 10.1
|-
| style="text-align:left;"| 
| style="text-align:left;"|Chicago
| 81 || 7 || 18.3 || .461 || .250 || .740 || 3.9 || 1.3 || 0.4 || 0.6 || 5.9
|-
| style="text-align:left;"| 
| style="text-align:left;"|Orlando
| 6 || 3 || 13.2 || .379 || – || .000 || 3.0 || 0.3 || 0.3 || 0.0 || 3.7
|-
| style="text-align:left;"| 
| style="text-align:left;"|Seattle
| 28 || 0 || 5.3 || .447 || – || .591 || 1.2 || 0.1 || 0.2 || 0.2 || 1.7
|- class="sortbottom"
| style="text-align:center;" colspan="2"| Career
| 891 || 309 || 23.3 || .484 || .189 || .747 || 5.9 || 1.7 || 0.4 || 1.0 || 8.5

Playoffs 

|-
|style="text-align:left;"|1979
|style="text-align:left;”|Washington
|12||–||5.3||.267||–||–||2.1||0.4||0.2||0.0||0.7
|-
|style="text-align:left;"|1980
|style="text-align:left;”|Washington
|2||–||4.5||.800||–||1.000||1.5||0.0||0.0||0.0||5.0
|-
|style="text-align:left;"|1981
|style="text-align:left;”|San Antonio
|7||–||23.0||.491||–||.692||6.9||2.3||0.6||1.1||9.0
|-
|style="text-align:left;"|1982
|style="text-align:left;”|San Antonio
|9||–||28.7||.462||–||.706||9.4||1.9||0.7||1.0||13.6
|-
|style="text-align:left;"|1985
|style="text-align:left;”|Chicago
|4||4||19.3||.667||–||.833||5.5||0.8||0.5||0.3||8.3
|-
|style="text-align:left;"|1986
|style="text-align:left;”|Chicago
|3||3||34.3||.552||–||1.000||9.0||2.0||0.3||0.7||12.0
|-
|style="text-align:left;"|1987
|style="text-align:left;”|Chicago
|3||3||40.7||.455||–||.778||7.0||2.3||0.3||1.0||9.0
|-
|style="text-align:left;"|1988
|style="text-align:left;”|Chicago
|10||10||30.8||.355||–||.538||5.7||0.8||0.3||0.8||6.1
|-
|style="text-align:left;"|1989
|style="text-align:left;”|Chicago
|16||0||13.7||.422||–||.647||2.6||0.6||0.3||0.4||4.1
|-
|style="text-align:left;"|1991
|style="text-align:left;”|Seattle
|2||0||6.0||.667||–||1.000||0.5||0.0||0.0||0.0||2.5
|- class="sortbottom"
| style="text-align:center;" colspan="2"| Career
| 68 || 20 || 19.6 || .455 || – || .707 || 4.9 || 1.0 || 0.3 || 0.5 || 6.3

References

1956 births
Living people
All-American college men's basketball players
American expatriate basketball people in Italy
American men's basketball players
Basketball coaches from Illinois
Basketball players from Illinois
Centers (basketball)
Chicago Bulls players
Continental Basketball Association coaches
DePaul Blue Demons men's basketball players
Orlando Magic players
People from Arlington Heights, Illinois
Power forwards (basketball)
San Antonio Spurs players
Seattle SuperSonics players
Sportspeople from Cook County, Illinois
Washington Bullets draft picks
Washington Bullets players
John Hersey High School alumni